Fredy Alonso Moncada Torres (born 10 November 1973 in Vélez, Santander) is a retired male road cyclist from Colombia. He won stages in the 1997 Vuelta a Colombia and the 2000 Vuelta a Venezuela.

References
 

1973 births
Living people
Colombian male cyclists
Vuelta a Colombia stage winners
Vuelta a Venezuela stage winners
Sportspeople from Santander Department
20th-century Colombian people